Acjacheme ("a heap of animated things") was an Acjachemen village that was closely situated to the mother village of Putuidem in what is now San Juan Capistrano, California. The Spanish missionaries constructed Mission San Juan Capistrano less than 60 yards from the village in 1776. Acjachemen is a pluralization of the word Acjacheme, and became the moniker for the people overall after the mission period.

The village has also been referred to as Akhachmai, Ahachmai, Akagchemem, Acágcheme, and Axatcme. The village site has been identified as being at an elementary school east of the mission by José de Grácia Cruz, who was one of the last native people born at the mission in the 1840s. Ahachmai has been referred to as a dialect or variety of the Acjachemen language and is used, although less commonly, to refer to the people as a whole.

History 

Gerónimo Boscana noted that the village "was later ruled by a relative called Choqual," who also was the leader of Putuidem. The village here was referred to as Atoum-pumcaxque, which was the village of Ahachmai. Choqual was a relative of Chief Oyaison, who came from Sejat, and his daughter Coronne.

Colonial encounters 

The Portolá expedition encountered the village in 1769. With the establishment of Mission San Juan Capistrano in 1778 next to the village, the mission was dependent on local villagers for labor.

Boscana, who was stationed at Mission San Juan Capistrano between 1814 to 1826, noted the following of the village:...the Indians, on returning home, arrived and put up for the night at a place called Acagchemen, distant from where the mission now stands only about sixty yards. From this time, the new colony assumed the name corresponding to the place. Acagchemen signifies a pyramidal form of anything that moves, such as an anthill or place of resort for other insects.

Mission San Juan Capistrano 

Acjacheme declined quickly after the establishment of Mission San Juan Capistrano in 1776. Many of the villagers were likely converted to Christianity shortly after the mission's founding. By 1810, there were 1,138 native converts at the mission. The San Juan Capistrano earthquake of 1812 collapsed a stone church built by "neophytes," with most of the casualties being Acjachemen women, likely from nearby villages. 

After the secularization of the mission in 1833, 4,317 natives had been baptized at the mission (1,689 adults and 2,628 children). The number of deaths at the mission was 3,158. The native people who survived the mission period primarily lived at the mission for a short period after and settled in the surrounding areas.

Further identification 
José de Gracia Cruz who was one of the last native people from Mission San Juan Capistrano (born in the 1840s), identified the village site as being at an elementary school east of the mission.

In 1980, some artifacts on the school grounds were still being found by native people, including "a fire pit or ring, some stone artifacts, and a quantity of shell." Two authors of a 1980 study stated that this site was, as a result, in need of more archaeological investigation.

Popular culture 
Eleanor Coerr's The Bell Ringer and the Pirates (1983) narrativizes the story of the attack on San Juan Capistrano by a group of pirates led by the French Hippolyte de Bouchard in 1818, with characters from Ahachmai. The book follows eight-year old boy Pio from the village, who warns his family and friends of the attack.

See also 

 Achooykomenga (the site of Mission San Fernando)
 Toviscanga (the site of Mission San Gabriel)
 Yaanga (the site of Pueblo de Los Ángeles)

References 

Acjachemen
California Mission Indians
Former Native American populated places in California
History of Orange County, California
Juaneño populated places
San Juan Capistrano, California